This is a list of notable people associated with the Renaissance.

Artists and architects

 Albrecht Altdorfer
 Jean Bullant
 Agnolo Bronzino
 Pieter Brueghel the Elder
 Pieter Brueghel the Younger
 Jan Brueghel the Younger
 Filippo Brunelleschi
 Marco Cardisco
 Juan de Castillo
 Androuet du Cerceau
 Jean Clouet
 François Clouet
 Colantonio
 Lucas Cranach the Elder
 Lucas Cranach the Younger 
 Philibert Delorme
 Donatello
 Albrecht Dürer
 Hans Dürer
 Jean Fouquet
 Rosso Fiorentino
 Francesco Fiorentino
 Piero della Francesca
 Marcus Gheeraerts
 Lorenzo Ghiberti
 Leonardo da Vinci
 Domenico Ghirlandaio
 Giuliano da Sangallo 
 Giorgione
 Giotto di Bondone
 Jean Goujon
 George Gower
 Benozzo Gozzoli
 El Greco
 Matthias Grünewald
 Juan de Herrera
 Nicholas Hilliard
 Francisco de Holanda
 Hans Holbein the Younger
 Inigo Jones
 Conrad Faber von Kreuznach
 Pierre Lescot
 Fra Filippo Lippi
 Lorenzo Lotto
 Pedro Machuca
 Andrea Mantegna
 Masaccio
 Antonello da Messina
 Michelangelo
 Luis de Morales
 Bernardo Morando
 Pietro Negroni
 Isaac Oliver
 Philibert de l'Orme
 Andrea Palladio
 Palma Vecchio
 Palma il Giovane
 Pietro Perugino
 Sebastian del Piombo
 Andrea Pisano
 Bernard Palissy
 Germain Pilon
 Pisanello
 Jan Polack
 Jacone Puligo
 Giovanni Baptista di Quadro
 Jan van Eyck
 Francesco Primaticcio
 Raphael
 Stanislaw Samostrzelnik
 Sebastiano Serlio
 Luca Signorelli
 Diego Siloe
 Il Sodoma
 Tintoretto
 Titian
 Juan Bautista de Toledo
 Andres de Vandelvira
 Paolo Veronese
 Rogier van der Weyden
 Andreas Vesalius

Mathematicians

 François d'Aguilon
 Petrus Apianus
 Tycho Brahe
 Gerolamo Cardano
 Nicolaus Copernicus
 Gemma Frisius
 Galileo Galilei
 Marin Getaldić
 Johannes Kepler
 Guidobaldo del Monte
 John Napier
 Pedro Nunes
 William Oughtred
 Luca Pacioli
 Robert Recorde
 Niccolò Fontana Tartaglia

Writers

 Ludovico Ariosto
 Martin Bauzer
 Luís de Camões
 Baldassare Castiglione
 Miguel de Cervantes
 Geoffrey Chaucer
 John of the Cross
 John Donne
 Alberico Gentili
 Marko Gerbec
 Ben Jonson
 Luis de León
 Christopher Marlowe
 Petrarch
 Christine de Pizan
 Poliziano
 François Rabelais
 Fernando de Rojas
 Lope de Rueda
 Pierre de Ronsard
 William Shakespeare
 Catherine of Siena
 Cicco Simonetta
 Garcilaso de la Vega
 Gil Vicente

Philosophers

 Robert Boyle
 Nicholas of Cusa
 Niccolò Machiavelli
 Pico della Mirandola
 Martín de Azpilcueta
 Francis Bacon
 Giordano Bruno
 Tommaso Campanella
 Nicholas of Cusa
 Cornelis Drebbel
 Desiderius Erasmus
 Marsilio Ficino
 Pietro Pomponazzi
 Francesco Guicciardini
 Michel de Montaigne
 Thomas More
 Antonio Serra
 Francisco Suárez
 Bernardino Telesio
 Francisco de Vitoria

Composers

 Gilles Binchois
 William Byrd
 Antonio de Cabezón
 Josquin des Prez
 John Dowland
 Guillaume Dufay
 Michelangelo Falvetti
 Giovanni Gabrieli
 Vincenzo Galilei
 Orlando Gibbons
 Jacobus Handl
 Heinrich Isaac
 Clément Janequin
 Orlandus Lassus
 Luca Marenzio
 Claudio Monteverdi
 Cristóbal de Morales
 Thomas Morley
 Jean Mouton
 Johannes Ockeghem
 Jacopo Peri
 Giovanni Pierluigi da Palestrina
 Michael Praetorius
 Thomas Tallis
 John Taverner
 Tomás Luis de Victoria
 Adrian Willaert
 Carlo Gesualdo

Dancing masters
 Balthasar de Beaujoyeulx
 Antonio Cornazzano
 Domenico da Piacenza
 Fabritio Caroso
 Thoinot Arbeau
 Cesare Negri

Explorers and navigators

 Christopher Columbus
 Amerigo Vespucci
 Vasco Núñez de Balboa
 Gonçalo Álvares
 John Cabot
 Giovanni Francesco Gemelli Careri
 Jacques Cartier
 Samuel de Champlain
 Gaspar Corte-Real
 Hernán Cortés
 Bartolomeu Dias
 Diogo Dias
 Sir Francis Drake
 Juan Sebastián Elcano
 Vasco da Gama
 Prince Henry
 Willem Janszoon
 Ferdinand Magellan
 Gerardus Mercator
 Vicente Yáñez Pinzón
 Francisco Pizarro
 Marco Polo
 Juan Ponce de Leon
 Abel Tasman
 Giovanni da Verrazzano
 João Gonçalves Zarco

Humanists

 Leon Battista Alberti
 Thomas Blundeville
 Giovanni Boccaccio
 Poggio Bracciolini
 Leonardo Bruni
 Johannes Cuspinian
 Erasmus
 Thomas More
 Matteo Palmieri
 Giovanni Pico della Mirandola
 François Rabelais
 Petrus Ramus
 Coluccio Salutati
 Andreas Stöberl
 Georg Tannstetter
 Juan Luis Vives
 Jan Campanus Vodňanský

Other influential people

 Francis I of France
 Henry VIII
 John Calvin
 Johannes Gutenberg
 Elizabeth I
 Pope Julius II
 Martin Luther
 The Medici
Lorenzo de' Medici
Jakob Fugger
Paracelsus
 Girolamo Savonarola
 Taccola
 Giorgio Vasari
 Andreas Vesalius
 Conrad Gessner

See also
 List of Renaissance structures
 Index of Renaissance articles

References

Lists of Renaissance people